William Boggs may refer to:

 William Ellison Boggs (1838–1920), chancellor of the University of Georgia
 William Robertson Boggs (1829–1911), Confederate general during the American Civil War
 Bill Boggs (born 1941), American TV presenter and journalist
 William Brenton Boggs (1918–2011), Canadian leader in military and commercial aviation
 William Benton Boggs (1854–1922), Louisiana politician